Okkadu Migiladu is a 2017 Indian Telugu-language war drama film directed by Ajay Andrews Nuthakki. The film stars Manchu Manoj, Anisha Ambrose, and Nuthakki.

Plot

Cast 
Manchu Manoj as Surya and Robert
Anisha Ambrose as Swarna
 Ajay Andrews Nuthakki as Victor 
Milind Gunaji as Education Minister
 Posani Krishna Murali as Shiva
 Suhasini Maniratnam
Murali Mohan

Release 
Neeshita Nyayapati of The Times of India gave the film a rating of two out of five stars and wrote that: "There are very few scenes in the film that manage to evoke any kind of emotion from the audience, despite the whole film relying on a heavy dose of melodrama". The Hindu critic Sangeetha Devi Dundoo stated that the filmmaking was a huge let-down. "It’s tiresome to sit through the melodrama, over-the-top acting by some of the cast, cinematography that’s often in a state of shaky movement, and some lecturing on human survival against divisive forces," she added. Hemanth Kumar writing for Firstpost gave the film a rating of two out of five and noted that: "This is a painful film, both for the characters in the story and also those who watch it. Two big thumbs down". The film’s Tamil version titled Naan Thirimba Varuven was released in 2017.

References

External links 

Indian war drama films
2017 war drama films
2010s Telugu-language films